The 1988 tournament championship game was played at Syracuse University in front of 20,148 fans. The Syracuse Orangemen defeated the Cornell Big Red, 13-8 for the first of their three straight NCAA titles.

Tournament overview
The 1988 national champion Syracuse team is notable for being undefeated, 15–0, and for featuring the Gait brothers Paul and Gary Gait. Syracuse was ranked number one in the nation for most of this year, had averaged just under 18 goals a game and had only one close game, an overtime win over North Carolina, during the regular season. They had defeated the second seed in the tournament, Johns Hopkins, 19 to 7 early in the season.

This NCAAs is also notable for being the tournament where Gary Gait took his famous "Air Gait" shot in a close semi-final game against Tony Seaman's University of Pennsylvania team. Penn played a tough zone defense to try to contain the Gaits and Syracuse. Gary Gait saw a way around the zone, by running directly at the goal from behind and slam dunking the ball into the goal past the shocked goaltender. At that time, a player was allowed to both touch the goal and land in the crease, provided the ball had first crossed the goal line. Gait scored on two "Air Gait" plays in that game. The NCAA outlawed that type of play a short while later. Syracuse won this semifinal game against Penn on a goal by Paul Gait with 3 seconds left.

In a 23–5 quarterfinal win over Navy, Gary Gait scored a tournament record 9 goals.

Tournament results 

(i) one overtime

Tournament boxscores

Tournament Finals

Tournament Semi-Finals

Tournament Quarterfinals

Tournament First Round

See also
Undefeated Division I Men's National Champions

References

External links 
"Air Gait" original Air Gait compilation on YouTube
"Air Gait" on YouTube
1988 Semifinals Syracuse v Penn "Air Gait" game, full game
"Air Gait" Writeup

NCAA Division I Men's Lacrosse Championship
NCAA Division I Men's Lacrosse Championship
1988 in lacrosse
NCAA Division I Men's Lacrosse